Gap Nunatak is a small nunatak,  high, standing in the center of Hordern Gap in the David Range of the Framnes Mountains, Antarctica. It was mapped by Norwegian cartographers from air photos taken by the Lars Christensen Expedition, 1936–37, and named "Metoppen" (the middle peak). It was renamed by the Australian National Antarctic Research Expeditions for its location in Hordern Gap.

References

Nunataks of Mac. Robertson Land